Ottestad Idrettslag is a Norwegian sports club from Ottestad in Stange, founded on 28 May 1918. It has sections for association football, team handball, cross-country skiing and cycling.

The men's football team have been playing in the Third Division since 2004, and plays its home matches at Ottestad Idrettspark.

The team reached the Second Round of the Norwegian Football Cup for the first time in 2012 Norwegian Football Cup, after beating Brumunddal 4–3 in the First Round. In the Second Round, Ottestad was beaten 2-0 by the Tippeligaen-club Lillestrøm, the same result as in 1993, the last time Ottestad met Lillestrøm.

References

External links
 Official site 

Football clubs in Norway
Sport in Hedmark
Stange
Association football clubs established in 1918
1918 establishments in Norway